The 2019 WGC-HSBC Champions was a golf tournament played from 31 October – 3 November 2019 at the Sheshan Golf Club in Shanghai, China. It was the eleventh WGC-HSBC Champions tournament, and the fourth of four World Golf Championships events held in the 2019 calendar year.

Rory McIlroy beat defending champion Xander Schauffele at the first hole of a sudden-death playoff after making a birdie 4 to Schauffele's par 5. It is his first WGC-HSBC Champions victory, and third World Golf Championship win overall, having already won the WGC Match Play and WGC Invitational.

Field
The following is a list of players who qualified for the 2019 WGC-HSBC Champions. The criteria are towards the leaders in points lists rather than tournament winners. Players who qualified from multiple categories are listed in the first category in which they are eligible with the other qualifying categories in parentheses next to the player's name.

1. Winners of the four major championships and The Players Championship
Shane Lowry (3,5), Rory McIlroy (3,4)
Brooks Koepka (2,3,4) did not play due to injury.
Gary Woodland (3,4) and Tiger Woods (3) did not play.

2. Winners of the previous four World Golf Championships
Kevin Kisner (3,4), Xander Schauffele (3,4)
Dustin Johnson (3,4) did not play due to injury.

3. Top 50 from the OWGR on 14 October
An Byeong-hun, Abraham Ancer (4), Keegan Bradley, Rafa Cabrera-Bello (5), Paul Casey (4,5), Tony Finau (4,5), Matt Fitzpatrick (5), Tommy Fleetwood (4,5), Sergio García (5), Adam Hadwin, Tyrrell Hatton, Billy Horschel, Im Sung-jae (4), Hideki Matsuyama (4), Phil Mickelson, Francesco Molinari (5), Louis Oosthuizen (4,5), Ian Poulter (5), Andrew Putnam, Chez Reavie (4), Patrick Reed (4), Justin Rose (4,5), Adam Scott (4), Jordan Spieth, Henrik Stenson, Matt Wallace (5), Bubba Watson, Bernd Wiesberger (5), Danny Willett (5)
Patrick Cantlay (4), Jason Day, Bryson DeChambeau (4), Rickie Fowler (4), Jim Furyk, Matt Kuchar (4), Marc Leishman (4), Kevin Na, Eddie Pepperell, Jon Rahm (4,5), Webb Simpson (4), Brandt Snedeker (4), and Justin Thomas (4) did not play.

4. Top 30 from the final 2019 FedEx Cup Playoffs points list (if there are less than five available players, players beyond 30th will be selected to increase the number to five)
Corey Conners, Lucas Glover, Charles Howell III, Jason Kokrak, Kevin Tway

5. Top 30 from the Race to Dubai as of 21 October
Christiaan Bezuidenhout, Jorge Campillo, Justin Harding (9), Benjamin Hébert, Kurt Kitayama, Romain Langasque, Li Haotong, Mike Lorenzo-Vera, Joost Luiten, Robert MacIntyre, Andrea Pavan, Victor Perez, Richard Sterne, Erik van Rooyen, Paul Waring

6. The leading four available players from the Asian Tour HSBC Qualification Standings as of 21 October
Scott Hend, Jazz Janewattananond, Masahiro Kawamura, Jbe' Kruger

7. The leading two available players from the Japan Golf Tour Order of Merit as of 21 October
Ryo Ishikawa, Chan Kim
Shugo Imahira did not play.

8. The leading two available players from the final 2018 PGA Tour of Australasia Order of Merit
Jake McLeod, Matthew Millar

9. The leading two available players from the final 2018–19 Sunshine Tour Order of Merit
Bryce Easton, Zander Lombard

10. Six players from China
Bai Zhengkai, Dou Zecheng, Liang Wenchong, Wu Ashun, Yuan Yechun, Zhang Xinjun

11. Alternates, if needed to fill the field of 78 players
The next available player on the Orders of Merit of the Asian Tour, Japan Golf Tour, Sunshine Tour, and PGA Tour of Australasia, ranked in order of their position in the OWGR as of 14 October
Next available player, not otherwise exempt, from Race to Dubai as of 21 October, OWGR as of 14 October, final 2019 FedEx Cup list 
Mikumu Horikawa (Japan Golf Tour; Shaun Norris did not play)
Neil Schietekat (Sunshine Tour)
Lee Tae-hee (Asian Tour)
Daniel Nisbet (PGA Tour of Australasia)
Matthias Schwab (Race to Dubai)
Cameron Smith (OWGR)
J. T. Poston (FedEx Cup)
Yosuke Asaji (Japan Golf Tour)
Chang Yi-keun (Asian Tour)

Round summaries

First round
Thursday, 31 October 2019

Li Haotong took a one-shot lead over Victor Perez by shooting an 8-under-par 64. Defending champion Xander Schauffele was two strokes back in a tied for third.

Second round
Friday, 1 November 2019

Matt Fitzpatrick shot a 5-under-par 67 to take a one shot lead over Rory McIlroy. First round leader Li Haotong shot 72 to drop into a tied for sixth place. Defending champion Xander Schauffele remained in a tied for third place with a second round 69.

Third round
Saturday, 2 November 2019

Final round
Sunday, 3 November 2019

Final leaderboard

Playoff

The sudden-death playoff started at the 18th hole.

References

External links
Official site
Coverage on Asian Tour's official site
Coverage on European Tour's official site
Coverage on PGA Tour's official site

WGC-HSBC Champions
WGC-HSBC Champions
WGC-HSBC Champions
WGC-HSBC Champions
WGC-HSBC Champions